Cabramatta ('Cabra') is a suburb in south-western Sydney, in the state of New South Wales, Australia.

Cabramatta has been a melting pot for all manner of Asian and European peoples in the latter half of the 20th century. Since the 1980s, Cabramatta has been a centre for the Vietnamese, as well as many residents from other Asian and European origins. At least as many as a quarter of Vietnamese speakers in Australia had some form of Chinese ancestry. Because of its high Vietnamese population, the suburb has earned the nickname 'Little Saigon'.

Cabramatta

European and Asian settlement
In 1795, an early settler named Hatfield called the area 'Moonshine Run' because it was so heavily timbered that moonshine could not penetrate. The name Cabramatta first came into use in the area in the early 19th century when the Bull family named a property they had purchased 'Cabramatta Park'. When a small village formed nearby in 1814, it took its name from that property. A township grew from this village, and a railway was built through Cabramatta in the 1850s. It was used for loading and unloading freight and livestock. The railway station was not open for public transport until 1856; a school was established in 1882, and a post office in 1886. Cabramatta remained a predominantly agricultural township.

It developed a close community relationship with neighbouring Canley Vale, and until 1899, they shared a common municipality. In 1948, Cabramatta's local government merged with the neighbouring City of Fairfield, and today remains governed by the Fairfield City Council. It evolved into a Sydney suburb in the mid 20th century, partly as the result of a major state housing project in the nearby Liverpool area in the 1960s that in turn swallowed Cabramatta. The presence of a migrant hostel alongside Cabramatta High School was decisive in shaping the community in the post-war period. In the first phase, large numbers of post-war immigrants from Europe passed through the hostel and settled in the surrounding area during the 1950s and 1960s. They satisfied labour demand for surrounding manufacturing and construction activities, and eventually gave birth to a rapidly growing population in the late 1960s and early 1970s. The entrepreneurs were developing local enterprises.

In the 1980s, Cabramatta and the surrounding Fairfield area was characterised by a diversity of Australian-born children having migrant parents. Cabramatta High School was statistically the most diverse and multicultural school in Sydney, and a study showed that only 10% of children had both parents born in Australia. While many other parts of Sydney had their particular ethnic flavour, Cabramatta was something of a melting pot.

During the 1980s, many of these migrant parents and their children – now young adults – were to settle and populate new housing developments in surrounding areas such as Smithfield and Bonnyrigg that were, until that time, market gardens or semi-rural areas owned by the previous generation. In the 1960s and 1970s, the migrant hostel – along with its peer in Villawood – hosted a second wave of migration: this time from south-east Asia as a result of the Vietnam War. During the 1980s, Cabramatta was transformed into a thriving Asian community, displacing many of the previous migrant generation. The students of Cabramatta High School represented all manner of people with Asian or European descent. The bustling city centre of Cabramatta could have been confused with the streets of Saigon.

By the early 1980s migration to Cabramatta declined, and as a result the migrant hostel and its many hundreds of small empty apartments lay prey to vandalism. Only the language school remained: it continued to teach English as a Second Language into the early 1990s, until the entire hostel site was demolished and redeveloped into residential housing. A walk through the hostel before its demolition would have revealed closed and boarded-up corrugated iron buildings once home to kitchens, washing facilities, administration and so forth. Drug activities began from the early 1990s (to late) as drug addicts and troublemakers were drawn to the area. However, since 2002, the problems have receded after an anti-drug crackdown was enforced by NSW State Parliament.

Central business district (CBD)
Freedom Plaza is located within the Cabramatta CBD and forms the pedestrian mall between John Street and Arthur Street. The Pai Lau or gateway forms the main ornamental feature of Freedom Plaza and symbolises harmony and multiculturalism. It was opened in 1991 by Nick Greiner, the Premier of New South Wales at the time, as part of Lunar New Year celebrations.

Dutton Plaza, a three-storey building located centrally within the Cabramatta CBD, was opened in June 2016. The Fairfield City Council funded and owned retail development replaced an existing Council owned at-grade car park and amenities building, with all income from the new development to be invested in community projects. The development comprises 31 retail premises and amenities on the ground floor, four offices on the first floor, and 275 car spaces on the first and second floors. The public open space fronting the main entrance on the eastern side of the plaza was named Gough Whitlam Place, in honour of Gough Whitlam who represented Cabramatta as the Member for Werriwa from 1952 to 1978. 

In addition to plazas, the suburb features a number of arcades and lanes that contain retail stores, eateries and cafes. Such passageways include Belvedere Arcade, Dutton Lane, Ingal Way and Viet Hoa Arcade, among others.

Schools

Current 
Local schools in the area including public, Catholic and private schools include:
 Cabramatta Public School
 Cabramatta West Public School
 Cabramatta High School
 Sacred Heart Primary School
 Clement College
 Harrington Street Public School

Previous 
Schools previously located in Cabramatta include:
 Pal College

Community facilities 
There are five Vietnamese Buddhist temples in the suburb:
 Minh Giac Monastery 
 Tinh Xa Minh Dang Quang 
 Long Quang Temple 
 Hung Long Temple 
 Bao An Temple

Parks 
The main public park in Cabramatta is Cabravale Park, which mainly fronts Railway Parade, but is also bordered by Park and McBurney Roads and Bartley Street. Cabravale Park contains children's play equipment, fitness equipment, a basketball court and seating. The park underwent a major upgrade in 2009 as part of Fairfield City Council's Parks Improvement Program. The park also serves as a war memorial. A heritage-listed bandstand, built in 1922 to honour the soldiers who lost their lives fighting in the First World War, is located near the centre of the park. The Vietnam War Comradeship Memorial, a monument containing a fountain and pond centred upon a bronze statue of two soldiers, is located near the main entrance of the park on Railway Pde. The monument was built to commemorate the comradeship between Australian and Vietnamese soldiers during the Vietnam War.

Other parks located in Cabramatta include Heather King Park (located on Vale St), Hughes Street Park, Longfield Street Park, Bolivia Street Park, Antonietta Street Park, Bowden Street Reserve and Panorama Street Reserve.

Transport
Cabramatta railway station is a junction station on the Sydney Trains network, where the Inner West & Leppington, Cumberland and Bankstown lines merge. A taxi station can also be found on Arthur Street in front of Cabramatta Post Office with frequent services and many taxis.

For details of bus services see Cabramatta station.

Population

Demographics
According to the 2021 census of Population, there were 21,142 residents in Cabramatta, with 28.6% of people born in Australia. The most common other countries of birth were Vietnam 37.6%, Cambodia 8.0%, China (excludes SARs and Taiwan) 4.0%, Thailand 2.1% and Laos 1.3%. The most common ancestries were Vietnamese 37.8%, Chinese 27.9%, Khmer (Cambodian) 8.8%, Australian 5.2% and English 5.4%. 

12.7% of people only spoke English at home. Other languages spoken at home included Vietnamese 43.3%, Cantonese 9.8%, Khmer 7.2%, Mandarin 4.9% and Min Nan 2.1%. The most common responses for religion in Cabramatta (State Suburbs) were Buddhism 42.2%, No Religion 24.0%, Catholic 13.5%, Not stated 8.1% and Christianity (Not Further Definition) 2.2%.

Notable residents
 Khoa Do (born 1979), filmmaker
 Michael Dwyer (1772–1825), convict
 Steve Ella (born 1960), 1980s Australian Kangaroo rugby league player
 Jon English (1949–2016), musician and actor
 Jarryd Hayne (born 1988), rugby league player
 Sue Hines (born 1959), award-winning children's author
 Rudolph Hoenger (1878–1952), rugby league player
 Paul Langmack (born 1965), rugby league player
 Gertrude Melville (1884–1959), politician
 Trey Mooney (born 2002), rugby league player
 John Newman (1946–1994), politician
 Phuong Ngo (born 1958), businessman, politician and convicted murderer
 Brendan Oake (born 1985), rugby league player
 Gough Whitlam (1916–2014), 21st Prime Minister of Australia
 Margaret Whitlam (1919–2012), social worker and champion swimmer
 Nicholas Whitlam (born 1945), businessman and corporate director
 Tony Whitlam (born 1944), politician and judge
 Darren Yap (born 1967), actor and director

Films set in the suburb
Taking Charge of Cabramatta, a documentary by Markus Lambert and Dai Le, was filmed in 1998. The documentary featured assassinated Cabramatta MP John Newman and former Fairfield Councillor Phuong Ngo, who was convicted of his murder, and was funded by SBS and screened by ABC TV.

Little Fish (2005) was filmed in the Cabramatta area. It starred Cate Blanchett, Sam Neill, Hugo Weaving and Martin Henderson. Prior to Little Fish, a film named The Finished People by Khoa Do, who grew up in a nearby suburb, was filmed/shot in the Cabramatta area.

Once Upon a Time in Cabramatta, a three-part documentary aired on SBS in 2012.

Change of Our Lives (2013) is a film by Maria Tran about the Vietnamese community and hepatitis B, set in Cabramatta. The movie was commissioned by the Cancer Council and Information and Cultural Exchange (ICE).

See also
 Vietnamese Australians
 Chinese Australians

References

External links 

 Cabramatta - Sydney.com
 Spokey Blokeys - Episode 19 - Cabramatta
 Online comic about Cabramatta by a native of the suburb